Fifth Gear is a British motoring television magazine series. Originally shown on Channel 5 from 2002 to 2011, Discovery from 2012 to 2014, History in 2015 and Quest since 2018. The show is currently presented by Jason Plato, Vicki Butler-Henderson, Jonny Smith and Jimmy de Ville with occasional appearances from Karun Chandhok. Fifth Gear's rival show is BBC Two's Top Gear.

Fifth Gear has been broadcast since 8 April 2002. Since then, 27 series have been produced with 255 episodes (as of 25 October 2018).

Series overview

Episodes

Series 1 (2002)

Series 2 (2002)

Series 3 (2003)

Series 4 (2003)

Series 5 (2004)

Series 6 (2004)

Series 7 (2005)

Series 8 (2005)

Series 9 (2006)

Series 10 (2006)

Series 11 (2007)

Series 12 (2007)

Series 13 (2008)

Series 14 (2008)

Series 15 (2009)

Series 16 (2009)

Series 17 (2010)

Series 18 (2010)

Series 19 (2011)

Series 20 (2011)

Series 21 (2012)

Series 22 (2013)

Series 23 (2013)

Series 24 (2014)

Series 25 (2015)

Series 26 (2015)

Series 27 (2018)

Series 28 (2019)

References

 Fifth Gear - Episode Guide - TV.com
 Fifth Gear | HISTORY

Fifth Gear